Harry William Holman (16 November 1957 – 6 November 2020) was an English professional footballer who played as a forward for Exeter City and Peterborough United in the Football League.

The son of a former Exeter City player, Harry was just one of two people to represent England in football and rugby at the under-15 level. After beginning his career in the Chelsea youth setup, he signed a deal with his hometown club in July 1976, and made his debut a few months later. That year they secured promotion to the Football League Third Division. In August 1978 he requested a transfer, and he made the move to Peterborough United, where he stayed until the end of the season. He moved back to Exeter, and played a few games with local non-league side Exmouth Town.

Holman died on 6 November 2020, aged 62, ten days shy of his 63rd birthday.

References

External links
 Harry Holman at Barry Hugman's Footballers

1957 births
2020 deaths
English footballers
England youth international footballers
Association football forwards
Exeter City F.C. players
Peterborough United F.C. players
Exmouth Town F.C. players
English Football League players
Sportspeople from Exeter